The Backstreet Six (lit. "Like the Six Fingers of a Hand") is a Canadian children's comedy film, directed by André Melançon and released in 1978. The film centres on a group of five young children who are submitting a newcomer to their neighbourhood to an initiation test to determine whether he will be welcome to join their group of friends, while the group are simultaneously on the trail of an older man whom they believe to be a spy.

The film's cast includes Éric Beauséjour, Philippe Bouchard, Caroline Laroche, Daniel Murray, José Neves, Nancy Normandin and Sylvain Provencher.

The film won the Prix L.-E.-Ouimet-Molson from the Association québécoise des critiques de cinéma in 1978.

References

External links

1978 films
1970s children's comedy films
Canadian children's comedy films
Films shot in Quebec
Films set in Quebec
Films directed by André Melançon
French-language Canadian films
1970s Canadian films